"Die for It" is a song by Palestinian-Canadian rapper Belly and Canadian singer the Weeknd, featuring vocals from American rapper Nas. It was released on August 27, 2021, through XO Records and Republic Records as the fourth single from Belly's third studio album, See You Next Wednesday, along with the album. The song was produced by Skinny, DaHeala, and the Anmls.

Background
On the song, the Weeknd handles the intro and chorus, while Belly handles the first verse and Nas handles the second verse. Belly also talked to Rolling Stone about how he felt about the song and collaboration: This collaboration felt like something special from the jump. Nas is someone I've always looked up to and learned from my whole life and getting a verse from him was definitely on my bucket list. An artist like Abel comes around once in a lifetime, being able to work with him has been one of my greatest blessings. Having both of them on one song is a dream come true. James Larese killed it as usual and gave us a movie. Even the production was a family affair, shout-out to DaHeala, The Anmls, and DannyboyStyles.

"Die for It" serves as the second collaboration between Belly and the Weeknd on the album, following the previously-released single, "Better Believe", alongside American rapper Young Thug. The Weeknd is also involved in the following two tracks of See You Next Wednesday: providing background vocals on "Requiem", featuring fellow Canadian rapper and labelmate Nav, and producing "Two Tone", featuring American rapper Lil Uzi Vert. Belly played the song on Drink Champs on June 11, 2021.

Music video
A music video for the song was released to Belly's YouTube channel alongside the song and album on August 27, 2021. The video starts with Belly walking around a city that shows "an apocalyptic red sky, burning buildings, and abandoned streets littered with newspapers" while smoking marijuana and drinking alcohol. It transitions to the Weeknd singing the first chorus through the screens of televisions that are falling through the sky, but he later comes to perform the remaining choruses in person. Belly performs his verse to the Weeknd going back to the chorus, which then turns to Nas appearing to perform his verse in a church's clock tower and ends with the Weeknd performing the last chorus.

Credits and personnel
Credits adapted from Tidal.

 Belly – lead vocals, songwriting
 The Weeknd – lead vocals, songwriting
 Nas – featured vocals, songwriting
 Sonia Ben Ammar – background vocals, songwriting
 DaHeala – production, songwriting, keyboards, programming
 Skinny – production, songwriting
 The ANMLS – production, songwriting, keyboards, programming
 Richard Munoz – production, songwriting, keyboards, programming
 Faris Al-Majed – production, songwriting, keyboards, programming, recording, studio personnel
 DannyBoyStyles – recording, studio personnel
 Shin Kamiyama – recording, studio personnel
 Gabriel Zardes – recording, studio personnel
 Mark Goodchild – recording, studio personnel
 Fabian Marasciullo – mixing, studio personnel
 Colin Leonard – mastering, studio personnel

Charts

References

 

 

2021 songs
2021 singles
Belly (rapper) songs
The Weeknd songs
Nas songs
Songs written by Belly (rapper)
Songs written by the Weeknd
Songs written by Nas
Songs written by DaHeala
XO (record label) singles
Republic Records singles